The Federer–Roddick rivalry was a tennis rivalry between Roger Federer and Andy Roddick. The two met 24 times in official Association of Tennis Professionals (ATP) matches, and Federer led 21–3. Although heavily lopsided in favor of Federer, the rivalry gained a lot of attention especially when both players were competing for the world No. 1 spot and also beyond that. In terms of number of matches played, it is the 14th  most prolific men's rivalry in the Open Era.

Both men are Grand Slam champions (Federer with 20 titles to Roddick's one) and former world No. 1 players. Roddick has lost four Grand Slam finals (Wimbledon in 2004, 2005, and 2009, and the US Open in 2006), all to Federer. Their match in the 2009 Wimbledon final, which reached a thirty-game fifth set, has been called one of the greatest matches in tennis history. On February 2, 2004, Federer overtook Roddick as world No. 1 to begin his record run of 237 consecutive weeks at the top position. They were the two highest-ranked players in the world from November 2003 to January 2005.

Roddick retired in 2012, ending the rivalry.

Notable matches

2002 Basel Quarterfinal
The third match played between Federer and Roddick was in Federer's hometown of Basel, Switzerland, at the 2002 Davidoff Swiss Indoors. Federer had won the first set in a tiebreak and was up by a break in the second set when Federer made what Patrick McEnroe said was the "best shot of his career". In the point, Roddick served to Federer and moved up to the net, implying that he would use a serve and volley tactic. However, he forced a weak return from Federer and hit an overhead smash that appeared to be a winner. Federer managed to run across the court and hit a slicing overhead, however, and Roddick watched as the shot landed just within the line, giving Federer the point. Federer went on to win the match in straight sets.

2003 Wimbledon semifinal
Both players had advanced to their first Wimbledon semifinals with relative ease, each one of them having lost only one set en route to the semifinal, and the winner of the match would be a heavy favorite against Mark Philippoussis in the final. The first set was close, and went to a tie break. In the tiebreak Roddick held set point at 6–5, however he would commit a forehand error into the net and Federer would go on to win the set, and the match 7–6, 6–3, 6–3 before defeating Phillipoussis in the final to win his first of eight Wimbledon titles.

2003 Montreal semifinal
Going into the match a win would have given Federer the number one ranking for the first time in his career. Roddick, the sixth seed at the 2003 Canada Masters tournament, had suffered four straight losses to Federer when he entered the match. He won the first set against Federer, who was the third seed, but Federer answered by winning the second set. In the third set, they went to their fifth tiebreaker in five matches, and Roddick prevailed to score his first victory over Federer. Roddick would go on to win back-to-back Masters tournaments in Montreal and Cincinnati, and the 2003 US Open, allowing him to secure the World No. 1 ranking.

2004 Wimbledon final
The 2004 Wimbledon Final marked the first time they had met in the final of any tournament and the first time they played as the top two players in the world. Roddick was able to break Federer's serve and win the first set by using his powerful forehand, but Federer bounced back and took the second and third sets, winning the third set in a tiebreak. Roddick continued to keep the match close in the fourth set, but Federer held him off to win his second Wimbledon title and third Grand Slam title.

2005 Wimbledon final
In 2005, Federer and Roddick played each other at Wimbledon for the third consecutive year and for the second straight year in the final. However, unlike their meeting last year, Federer won the first set with ease, breaking Roddick twice during the set. Roddick forced a tiebreak in the second set, but Federer prevailed in the tiebreak. Federer then proceeded to  finish off the match after breaking Roddick once more, winning it in straight sets. It was Federer's third consecutive Wimbledon title and his fifth Grand Slam title.

2006 US Open final
The 2006 US Open final marked the sixth consecutive meeting in a final between Roddick and Federer, and their third consecutive in the final of a Grand Slam. Federer broke Roddick twice in the first set to win it, but Roddick broke Federer early in the second set, and held the early lead to win the set. Federer grabbed a late break against Roddick to prevent a tiebreak and win the third set, and he cruised past Roddick in the fourth set to win his third consecutive US Open.

2007 Australian Open semifinal
Before the 2007 Australian Open, Roddick had challenged Federer in both the US Open final and the year-end championships in Shanghai and had pulled off an impressive victory over him at an exhibition tournament in Kooyong. Roddick had received much attention for claiming that he felt the gap between him and Federer was closing. Many pundits, and commentators, had expressed their belief that Roddick would finally win his second major at this event. The match began as a close affair until Federer broke Roddick late in the set and served out the set. Federer then proceeded to fly past Roddick, breaking him three times in the second set and two times in the third set to wrap up the match, 6–4, 6–0, 6–2. Following the match, Roddick gave his most famous press conference. When asked how he felt at the end of the match, Roddick stated, "It was frustrating, you know, it was miserable, it sucked, it was terrible. But besides that it was fine". The nature of Roddick's defeat to Federer, especially considering how well he had played up until the final, made many seriously question whether Roddick would ever be able to win another major so long as Federer was playing.

2008 Miami quarterfinal
Before the matchup, both Federer and Roddick were having poor starts to their seasons; Roddick had suffered early losses in the Australian Open and in the Indian Wells Masters, while Federer was suffering from mononucleosis. At the 2008 Sony Ericsson Open (Miami Masters), Roddick won the first set tiebreak, but a break of serve in the second set allowed Federer to level the match. Roddick continued to play well, however, and won the third set, pulling out his second win over Federer and his first in almost five years.

2009 Australian Open semifinal

Roger Federer and Andy Roddick met for a seventh time in a Grand Slam in the Semi Finals of the 2009 Australian Open. It marked their first Grand Slam contest in over a year. Roddick had beaten the defending champion Novak Djokovic in the quarter finals, and was having relative success under his new head coach Larry Stefanki. Despite Roddick's good form going into the match Federer was a straight sets winner taking the match 6–2 7–5 7–5.

2009 Wimbledon final

Without question, the 2009 Wimbledon final was Federer and Roddick's most historic match, and their first meeting in a final since the 2006 US Open. Prior to the match, Federer had only dropped one set during the entire tournament, but Roddick had struggled to win his first three matches. Federer and Roddick were both serving well to start the match, but Roddick secured a break late in the set and took the first set. The second set went to a tiebreaker, and Roddick quickly secured four set points and led 6-2. But, on the fourth set point, Roddick mishit a backhand volley to level the tiebreaker at 6-6, and Federer took advantage of Roddick's miss to win six consecutive points from 6-2 down to win the tiebreaker 8-6 and take the second set. The third set also resulted in a tight tiebreak, which Federer won. However, in the fourth set, Roddick took momentum away from Federer with a well-placed backhand passing shot down the line to break Federer. Roddick managed to continue to hold for the rest of the set to take it 6–3. Through four sets, Federer was unable to break Roddick's powerful serve. In the deciding fifth set, both players held serve until the score was 15–14 and a mishit forehand by Roddick gave Federer a break point and match point. Federer converted the point to win the match, which gave Federer his sixth Wimbledon title. Federer also won his fifteenth Grand Slam, which broke Pete Sampras's record for most Grand Slams won. The match continues to hold the record for being the longest Wimbledon final in terms of games played.

2012 Miami 3rd round
Federer and Roddick met for the 24th and final time in the 3rd round at Miami, with Federer leading the head-to-head 21–2. This was the first and only time they had met before the quarter-finals of any tournament. In the first set, both players held serve 6 times which led to a tiebreak in the first set, which Roddick won 7–6 (7–5). Federer cruised through the second set, winning it 6–1. Early in the third set, Roddick saved three break points for a crucial hold. The next game he broke Federer with four crushing forehand winners. Roddick went on to hold for the rest of the set, securing the win with a service winner in only the 3rd time he's beaten Federer. It proved to be their final meeting, as Roddick ended his career at the 2012 US Open, thus securing the head-to-head record at 21–3.

List of all matches

Singles (24)
Federer 21 – Roddick 3

Exhibition matches

Federer–Roddick (1–2)

Analysis

Head-to-head tallies
All matches: (24)  Federer 21–3
All finals: Federer 7–0
 Hard courts: Federer 14–3
 Outdoor: Federer 9–3
 Indoor: Federer 5–0
 Grass courts: Federer 4–0
 Carpet courts: Federer 2–0
 Clay courts: Federer 1–0
 Grand Slam matches: Federer 8–0
 Grand Slam finals: Federer 4–0
Tennis Masters Cup matches: Federer 3–0
 ATP Masters Series/ATP World Tour Masters 1000 matches: Federer 4–3
 ATP Masters Series/ATP World Tour Masters 1000 finals: Federer 2–0

Performance timeline comparison (Grand Slam tournaments) 

 Bold = players met during this tournament

2001–2006

2007–2012

Career evolution 
Federer and Roddick were born about one year apart. Federer's birthday is August 8, 1981, while Roddick's is August 30, 1982. A different viewpoint of their career evolution is offered by taking the season they entered with an age of 17 as starting point. For instance in 2004, Federer started the season at 22 years old; at the end of that season, he accumulated a career record of four Grand Slam titles, a total of 22 singles titles. and his final ranking was No. 1 at 23 years old.

 = active record (updated Monday 30 January 2017)

References

External links
Federer-Roddick Head-to-Head

Tennis rivalries
Sports rivalries in the United States
Roger Federer